Aleksei Aleksandrovich Zuev (born 3 February 1981) is a Russian former association football goalkeeper.

Club career
He made two appearances in 2006–07 UEFA Champions League.

Personal life
On 3 March 2007 he was arrested for threatening a man with rubber-bullet gun and driving under the influence. Later blood test confirmed that he was drunk. Next day he was charged with hooliganism.

References

External links
UEFA.com bio

1981 births
Footballers from Moscow
Living people
Russian footballers
Association football goalkeepers
FC Spartak Moscow players
FC Vityaz Podolsk players
FC Khimki players
Russian Premier League players